The 1982 World Judo Championships were the 2nd edition of the Women's World Judo Championships, and were held in Paris, France from 4–5 December, 1982.

Medal overview

Women

Medal table

External links
 

 page of WC-results in the Judo Encyclopedia by T. Plavecz retrieved December 11, 2013

W
Judo
World Judo Championships
World Judo Championships
World
J